Miss Universe România is a national beauty pageant that has selected Romania's representative to the Miss Universe pageant.

History
Miss România was initially established in the late 1920s, Magda Demetrescu won the first pageant in 1929.  She then participated in the former Miss Universe pageant (officially the International Pageant of Pulchritude) in Texas, where she placed sixth.  The following year, Mariana Mirica placed third.  After this Texas international pageant ended in 1932, Dorothee Cristescu participated in "Miss Universe" Brussels in 1935.

Romania's participation in international pageants ceased by 1929, though a Communist-pageant was held in the country in the 1970s.  

Romania's participation in the modern Miss Universe pageant began with Miss Romania Daniella Nane who participated in Miss Universe 1991, and where the famous Romanian gymnast Nadia Comăneci served on the international jury.  After 1998, Romania dropped from Miss Universe for 11 years, and returned in 2009. In 2016, the license to celebrate the contest Miss Universe Romania was granted to the agency ExclusivEvent, having as president to Ernest Hadrian Böhm.

Titleholders

Titleholders under Miss Universe România

Miss Universe România

The Winner of Miss Universe Romania represents the country at the Miss Universe pageant. If the winner will resign the title, the runner-up will take over the crown.

Miss România 1991-1998

Hosts
Valentina Ionescu

See also
 List of Romania representatives at international beauty pageants

References

Further reading
  
 (English-translated page)
 "Ultima şansă pentru constănţence să se înscrie la „Miss Universe România”!". Telegraf. (English-translated page)
 "Miss Universe Romania, "o ciumafaie cromoplatinata"".(English-translated page)

External links
 

Beauty pageants in Romania
1920s establishments in Romania
1991 establishments in Romania
Romanian awards
Romania